An election for the New York City Comptroller was held on November 5, 1929, the same day as other such contests as the mayoralty, aldermen, President of the Board of Aldermen, Borough presidents, and County sheriffs. Incumbent Charles W. Berry was reelected, defeating Republican candidate Harold G. Aron, Socialist candidate Charles Solomon, and Square Deal Party candidate George E. Polhemus to win reelection. Communist Otto Hall, Social Laborite August Gillhaus, and Charlotte O. Schetter of the Commonwealth Land Party also contested the election.

References

New York City Comptrollers
New York City Comptroller election
Comptroller election
New York City Comptroller election
New York City Comptroller election